Ebbe Vilborg (14 February 1926 – 30 December 2018) was a Swedish philologist focusing on classical languages, a docent of Ancient Greek at the University of Gothenburg, an Esperantist (from 1940 on), a lexicographer, terminologist, interlinguist and an honorary member of Universal Esperanto Association (UEA) (from 2001 on).

References

External links 
 Books by or about Ebbe Vilborg in the Department of Planned Languages and Esperanto Museum
 Articles by or about Ebbe Vilborg in Elektronika Bibliografio de Esperantaj Artikoloj (EBEA)
 A small Bibliography in Terminoteko 4th year, 2/1994 (No. 10), p. 20-21.

1926 births
2018 deaths
Volapükologists
Linguists from Sweden
Swedish Esperantists
Esperanto lexicographers
Interlinguistics
Esperanto educators
Academic staff of the University of Gothenburg